Juan Carlos Lemus Garcia (born May 6, 1966) is a Cuban boxer, who won the gold medal in the men's Light Middleweight (71 kg) category at the 1992 Summer Olympics in Barcelona. Lemus also was awarded the gold medal at the 1987 Pan American Games, as well as the World Amateur Boxing Championships in 1991, beating the reigning champion at that time, Israel Akopkochyan.

Olympic results
Defeated Arkadiy Topayev (Unified Team) 11-0
Defeated Markus Beyer (Germany) RSCH 1 (0:44)
Defeated Igors Saplavskis (Latvia) 12-2
Defeated György Mizsei (Hungary) 10-2
Defeated Orhan Delibaş (Netherlands) 6-1
Boxan gold medal Pre-olympics Barcelona 1992 and best boxer of the tournament also, with Oscar De La Hoya.

References

Biography of Juan Carlos Lemus 

1965 births
Living people
Boxers at the 1987 Pan American Games
Boxers at the 1991 Pan American Games
Boxers at the 1992 Summer Olympics
Olympic boxers of Cuba
Olympic gold medalists for Cuba
Olympic medalists in boxing
Cuban male boxers
Cuban emigrants to Spain
AIBA World Boxing Championships medalists
Medalists at the 1992 Summer Olympics
Pan American Games gold medalists for Cuba
Pan American Games medalists in boxing
Competitors at the 1993 Central American and Caribbean Games
Central American and Caribbean Games gold medalists for Cuba
Welterweight boxers
Central American and Caribbean Games medalists in boxing
Medalists at the 1987 Pan American Games
Medalists at the 1991 Pan American Games
20th-century Cuban people